The Madonna with the Christ Child Writing is a painting by the Italian Renaissance master Pinturicchio, painted around 1494-1498 and housed in the Philadelphia Museum of Art, in the United States.

The painting is derived from the Madonna of Peace (c. 1490), a simplification  for a less acculturated commissioner, perhaps a private family. The Virgin sits on a kind of cask, and is offering a book to the Child, who writes on it. The garments of the Child are perhaps inspired by the late Byzantine mosaics seen by Pinturicchio in Rome.

In the background is a small depiction of the Flight into Egypt and two symmetrical trees, one which is a palm, a symbol of martyrdom.

Sources

1490s paintings
Paintings in the collection of the Philadelphia Museum of Art
Paintings of the Madonna and Child by Pinturicchio
Paintings depicting the Flight into Egypt
Books in art